Clavus pica is a species of sea snail, a marine gastropod mollusk in the family Drilliidae.

Description
The size of an adult shell varies between 8 mm and 25 mm. The thick shell is whitish, irregularly variegated with a few large squarish brown spots. The upper portion of the whorls is smooth, concave, below the periphery with numerous narrow ribs. The anal sinus is broad.

Distribution
This species occurs in the demersal zone of the Indo-Pacific off Guam, the Philippines, Indonesia, Tuamotus and Christmas Island.

References

 Tucker, J.K. 2004 Catalog of recent and fossil turrids (Mollusca: Gastropoda). Zootaxa 682:1–1295
  Kilburn R.N., Fedosov A. & Kantor Yu.I. (2014) The shallow-water New Caledonia Drilliidae of genus Clavus Montfort, 1810 (Mollusca: Gastropoda: Conoidea). Zootaxa 3818(1): 1–69

External links
 

pica
Gastropods described in 1843